Judit Dukai Takách (1795–1836), was a Hungarian poet. She was known under her pseudonym Malvina.

Notes

1795 births
1836 deaths
Hungarian women poets
19th-century Hungarian poets
19th-century Hungarian women writers